Opaleniec  is a village in the administrative district of Gmina Chorzele, within Przasnysz County, Masovian Voivodeship, in east-central Poland.

History 
The village existed in 1550 and was so-called church village. Before World War I, border markets were held twice a year in Opaleniec. During the interwar period, near Opaleniec, a German-Polish border ran (Opaleniec / Opalenietz was in East Prussia), there was a customs office in the village.

Notable residents
 Emil Badorrek (1910–1944), Luftwaffe pilot

References

Villages in Przasnysz County